The Gonville and Caius Range is a range of peaks,  high, between Mackay Glacier and Debenham Glacier in Victoria Land Antarctica. It was first mapped by the British Antarctic Expedition, 1910–13, under Robert Falcon Scott, and was named for Gonville and Caius College, of Cambridge University, the alma mater of several members of the expedition.

References

Mountain ranges of Victoria Land
Scott Coast